Sauca is a village in Ocnița District, Moldova.

References

Villages of Ocnița District